Hollie Daniels (born 1983) is an activist, sex trafficking survivor and a advocate for victims of domestic violence in Columbus, Ohio.

Background
Daniels' mother first sold her at the age of 15 and was enslaved by drugs for 17 years. With the help of an innovative judicial program called CATCH Court, which detects criminals who are actually victims, she was able to escape in 2015. Most women who are victims of sex trafficking in the United States are marked with tattoos and scars and has since transformed the tattoos of her own body to reaffirm control over her life.

After her release from prison, Daniels was involved in a non-profit organization called Reaching For the Shining Starz, which helps potential victims of sex trafficking. She soon became its executive director. On the first outing as a volunteer, she met her little sister Rosie, who had followed a similar path to hers. She continued to visit her every week for a year, until Rosie managed to leave life on the street behind as well.

Daniels received a scholarship to study communications at Ohio State University and works as a legal advocate for victims of domestic violence in a Columbus court.

Recognition
She was recognized as one of the BBC's 100 women of 2019.

References

1983 births
Living people
Anti–human trafficking activists
Crime victim advocates
Anti-prostitution activists in the United States
American women lawyers
Forced prostitution in the United States
American victims of crime
Child prostitution in the United States
People from Columbus, Ohio
American prostitutes
Human trafficking in the United States
Kidnapped American children
Activists from Ohio
Victims of underage prostitution
BBC 100 Women